Weapons of the Weak: Everyday Forms of Peasant Resistance is a 1985 book on everyday forms of rural class conflict as illustrated in a Malaysian village, written by anthropologist James C. Scott and published by Yale University Press.

Some of the tactics used by the villagers include sabotage, foot-dragging, evasion, false compliance, pilfering, feigned ignorance, and slander.

See also 

 Everyday Resistance
 Class struggle
 Critique of work
 Critique of political economy
 Symbolic interactionism
 Refusal of work

Further reading

External links 

 

1986 non-fiction books
American non-fiction books
Anthropology books
Books by James C. Scott
Yale University Press books